The Hajj Agha Ali Mosque dates from the Qajar dynasty and is located in Kerman.

Sources 

Mosques in Iran
National works of Iran
Mosque buildings with domes